Arthur Wills may refer to:

Arthur Wills (musician) (1926-2020), English musician, composer, and professor
Arthur Walters Wills (1868–1948), English politician, MP for North Dorset
Howard Arthur Wills, former Australian Chief Defence Scientist (1968–1971)

See also
Arthur Will (1871–1940), Kentucky carpenter, builder, politician and public official